Events from the year 1853 in the United Kingdom.

Incumbents
 Monarch – Victoria
 Prime Minister – George Hamilton-Gordon, 4th Earl of Aberdeen (Coalition)
 Parliament – 16th

Events
 20 January – the United Kingdom annexes Lower Burma ending the Second Anglo-Burmese War.
 4 February – Halifax Permanent Benefit Building Society takes its first deposits.
 14 February – United Kingdom Alliance for the Suppression of the Traffic in all Intoxicating Liquors formed in Manchester.
 15 February – PS Queen Victoria sinks in a snowstorm at night entering Dublin Bay with the loss of more than 80 lives.
 18 February – a treaty is signed with the United States concerning international copyright.
 29 March – Manchester is granted city status by letters patent.
 May – the world's first public aquarium is opened in London Zoo.
 5 May – Perpetual Maritime Truce comes into force between the United Kingdom and the rulers of the Sheikhdoms of the Lower Gulf, later known as the Trucial States.
 6 June – naval fleet travels to Besika Bay to fend off Russian threats to the Ottoman Empire.
 25 June – Hochster v De La Tour, a landmark case on anticipatory breach of contract in English contract law, is decided in the Court of Queen's Bench.
 1 July – first constitution of the Cape Colony provides for a legislative council.
 1 August – under terms of the Vaccination Act, all children born after this date are to receive compulsory vaccination against smallpox during their first 3 months of life, with defaulting parents subject to a fine.
 12 August – Licensing (Scotland) Act (known after its sponsor as the 'Forbes Mackenzie Act') regulates the supply of intoxicating beverages in Scotland.
 September (approx.) – first pillar box on the British mainland erected in Carlisle.
 14 September – West Australian becomes the first horse to win the English Triple Crown by finishing first in the Epsom Derby, 2,000 Guineas and St Leger.
 28 September – emigrant ship Annie Jane sinks in heavy seas off the Scottish island of Vatersay with the loss of 350 lives.
 31 October–15 May 1854 – lockout of Preston cotton mill workers seeking reinstatement of ten per cent of their pay; this will be Britain's longest industrial dispute up to this date.
 3 December – Crimean War: a protocol is signed with France, Austria, and Prussia for restoring peace between Russia and Turkey.
 14 December – Palmerston resigns as Home Secretary over demands for parliamentary reform, but changes his mind on 23 December.
 15 December – the Sierra redwood Sequoiadendron giganteum is introduced to England as Wellingtonia by William Lobb.

Undated
 Penal Servitude Act provides for convicted criminals to serve their entire sentence in prison, rather than suffer transportation, and also to be freed on licence.
 Betting Houses Act prohibits betting shops, restricting legal betting on horse racing to racecourses.
 Highland Clearances in Skye and Raasay.
 J. S. Fry & Sons of Bristol produce their Cream Stick, predecessor of Fry's Chocolate Cream and the first mass produced chocolate bar.

Publications
 Charlotte Brontë's novel Villette (published as by Currer Bell).
 Mrs Gaskell's novel Ruth.
 Robert Smith Surtees' comic novel Mr. Sponge's Sporting Tour.
 Charlotte M. Yonge's novel The Heir of Redclyffe.

Births
 29 March – Elihu Thomson, engineer and inventor (died 1937)
 7 April – Prince Leopold, Duke of Albany, member of the royal family (died 1884)
 3 June – Flinders Petrie, Egyptologist (died 1942)
 5 July – Cecil Rhodes, businessman (died 1902)

Deaths
 27 January – John Iltyd Nicholl, Welsh politician (born 1797)
 12 April – James Foster, ironmaster (born 1786)
 15 August – Frederick William Robertson, Anglican preacher (born 1816)
 19 August – Sir George Cockburn, Naval commander (born 1772)
 29 August – Sir Charles James Napier, general and Commander-in-Chief in India (born 1782)
 6 September – George Bradshaw, cartographer and timetable publisher (born 1800)

See also
 1853 in Scotland

References

 
Years of the 19th century in the United Kingdom